This is a list of Pakistani breads. Bread is a staple food prepared from a dough of flour and water, usually by baking. Throughout recorded history it has been popular around the world and is one of humanity's oldest foods, having been of importance since the dawn of agriculture. Pakistan is a sovereign country in South Asia. Pakistani cuisine is a refined blend of various regional cooking traditions of South Asia. Pakistani cuisine is known for its richness and flavour. Within Pakistan, cuisine varies greatly from region to region, reflecting the country's ethnic and cultural diversity.

Pakistani breads of Central Asian origin, such as Naan and tandoori roti, are baked in a tandoor. Naan is usually leavened with yeast.

Most flat breads from Pakistan are unleavened and made primarily from milled flour, usually atta or maida, and water. Some flatbreads, especially paratha, may be stuffed with vegetables and layered with either ghee or butter.

Pakistani breads

 Afghan bread – the national bread of Afghanistan
 Roghni Naan – When preparing the dough, flour is mixed with desi ghee and milk. The dough is garnished with sesame seeds before baking the naan.
 Aloo paratha – The dough of bread is filled with potatoes' pure. The potatoes can include different kind of spices. 
 Bajre ki roti – This bread is made of pearl millet flour. It can be made as salt bread or sweet bread. For making sweet roti (bread), the dough is mixed with treacle (gur ka mail).
 Bakarkhani 
 Bhatoora 
 Chapati  
 Kaak 
 Kalonji naan – kalonji seeds mixed with naan flour
 Kulcha 
 Makki di roti – the bread is made with corn flour
 Naan
 Papadum 
 Phitti 
 Puri 
 Roti 
 Rumali Roti
 Sheermal 
 Taftan (bread) 
 Tandoor bread

See also

 Pakistani breads
 Chili parotha
 List of baked goods
 List of breads
 List of Pakistani spices
 List of Pakistani condiments
 Lists of prepared foods

References

Pakistani breads
Lists of breads
Breads